Cosmotoma sertifer is a species of longhorn beetles of the subfamily Lamiinae. It was described by Audinet-Serville in 1835, and is known from Brazil.

References

Beetles described in 1835
Cosmotoma